Def Jam Recordings (also simply known as Def Jam) is an American multinational record label owned by Universal Music Group. It is based in Manhattan, New York City, specializing predominantly in hip hop, contemporary R&B, soul and pop.

The label has a London-based, UK arm known as 0207 Def Jam (formerly Def Jam UK in the 1990s until the mid-2000s) and is currently operated through EMI Records. It has a Johannesburg, South Africa and Lagos, Nigeria-based arm known as Def Jam Africa. Def Jam distributes releases of various label imprints, including Dave East's From the Dirt Records. Current artists include Justin Bieber, Toya Johnson, Nasty C, 2 Chainz, Dave East, Jeezy, Jeremih, Jhené Aiko, and Fredo Bang, among others.

Company history

Founding and CBS Records Group era (1983–1994)
Def Jam was co-founded by Rick Rubin in his dormitory in Weinstein Hall at New York University, and its first release was a single by his punk-rock group Hose. Russell Simmons joined Rubin shortly after they were introduced to each other, according to one story, by Vincent Gallo. Another cites DJ Jazzy Jay as their connector. Rubin has said he met Simmons on the TV show Graffiti Rock and recognized him then as "the face of hip hop": "He was five years older than me, and he was already established in the music business. And I had no experience whatsoever." The second single released with the Def Jam Recordings logo was T La Rock & Jazzy Jay's "It's Yours." The first releases with Def Jam Recordings catalog numbers were LL Cool J's "I Need a Beat" and the Beastie Boys' "Rock Hard", both in 1984. The singles sold well, eventually leading to a distribution deal with CBS Records through Columbia Records the following year. However, the Hose and T La Rock releases were not part of the deal and are now controlled by different entities.

This created a short-lived subsidiary label called OBR Records, short for Original Black Recordings, which catered toward R&B artists—the first artist signed to that imprint was Oran "Juice" Jones, who enjoyed success with his hit single "The Rain". A few years later, Russell Simmons and Lyor Cohen started an umbrella label called Rush Associated Labels to handle Def Jam and its numerous spinoff labels. RAL became the home to Nice & Smooth and EPMD after both acts were acquired due to the folding of their former label Sleeping Bag Records. Other acts under the RAL umbrella included Redman, Onyx, Flatlinerz, Domino, Warren G and Jayo Felony. Def Jam also signed its first and only thrash metal band, Slayer, in 1986, and the band's third and fourth albums were the only two Def Jam releases to be distributed through Geffen Records via Warner Bros. Records as opposed to Columbia/CBS. As the decade drew to a close, the label signed Public Enemy, whose controversial lyrical content garnered the company both critical acclaim and disdain. Lyor Cohen became president of Def Jam/RAL in 1988, after winning a power struggle with Rubin, who would shortly thereafter leave the company to form Def American Recordings. Rubin would take Slayer and the rights of its Def Jam albums with him to Def American in its initial stages.

In 1991, CBS Records was folded (or rather rebranded) to the music division of Japanese electronic giant Sony, bringing Def Jam and Columbia with it. By 1992, despite recent multiple platinum selling releases from Public Enemy, and EPMD, Def Jam ran into major financial troubles and was faced with folding while at Sony.

PolyGram era (1994–1998)
In 1994, PolyGram purchased Sony's 50% stake in Def Jam Recordings—subsequently bringing the label into the Island Records fold. Island would share in sales and marketing duties with select radio projects while Def Jam remained independent on all other label functions (A&R, video, promotion and publicity). The label venture went on to receive huge success with a slew of various other multi-platinum releases from Montell Jordan, Public Enemy, LL Cool J, Redman, Method Man and more. RAL/Def Jam also distributed the Violator Records-signed artist Warren G's debut album, Regulate... G Funk Era, which went triple platinum and brought much-needed revenue to Def Jam through its joint deal with Violator.

PolyGram acquired an additional 10% in Def Jam, further strengthening its ownership of the label. Shortly thereafter, Rush Associated Labels were renamed to the Def Jam Music Group. The label remained profitable as its veteran star LL Cool J released his successful album Mr. Smith in 1995, a return to the rapper's original credibility following the fallback of his 1993 album, 14 Shots to the Dome; his last album under the Def Jam/Columbia partnership. The label later signed Foxy Brown, whose debut album, Ill Na Na (1996) became a platinum seller in 1997. Def Jam followed up with its then-new R&B act, Case, whose self-titled debut album (also in 1996), including the single, "Touch Me, Tease Me", went gold.

In June 1997, Def Jam acquired 50% of Roc-A-Fella Records for an estimated $1.4 million, giving co-founders Jay-Z and Damon Dash part ownership of the label, while Def Jam maintained distribution and co-marketing.

In 1997, through Def Jam A&R Irv Gotti, Def Jam signed Ruff Ryders artist DMX. DMX's first studio album, It's Dark and Hell is Hot was released on May 12, 1998 and was co-executive produced by Irv Gotti. The album debuted and peaked at number 1 on the Billboard Top 200 and sold over 250,000 copies in its first week. The album went on to sell four million copies in America, being certified Quadruple Platinum by the RIAA, and sold five million copies worldwide. The success of the album prompted Lyor Cohen to challenge DMX to record another album quickly to have another album released within the same calendar year. DMX's second studio album, Flesh of My Flesh, Blood of My Blood was released on December 22, 1998 and debuted and peaked at number one the Billboard Top 200. The album sold over 670,000 units in its first week of release, and went on to sell over four million copies. DMX claimed that Def Jam made $144 million from the sales of his first two albums.

The Island Def Jam Music Group founding (1998–2000)
In 1998, PolyGram was purchased by Universal Pictures' former parent, Seagram, and later merged with the MCA group of record labels. In early 1999, the label group was rebranded as the Universal Music Group. It then purchased the remaining interest of Def Jam Recordings from Russell Simmons for a reported $100 million. UMG merged over 14 record labels including Def Jam, Island, and Mercury Records together to form the Island Def Jam Music Group. Despite the formation of IDJMG, the Def Jam, Mercury, and Island labels continued to operate as separate imprints underneath the umbrella.

Lyor Cohen was appointed co-president of IDJMG, and Kevin Liles succeeded him as president of Def Jam. In 1998, Def Jam created an R&B spin-off label called Def Soul Records to run under the label's companionship. Def Jam inherited many of Island's urban artists, including Dru Hill (including its lead singer Sisqó), the Isley Brothers (featuring Ronald Isley) and Kelly Price. Def Soul also issued recordings by Musiq Soulchild, Montell Jordan, Case, 112, Patti LaBelle, and Christina Milian. Liles also assumed presidency of Def Soul, which also formed a Classics subsidiary (active from 2003 to 2011). Island's 4th & B'way Records was also folded into Def Jam.

Also in 1999, the label began to distribute releases by Murder Inc. Records, the newly-founded label run by former Def Jam A&R executive and record producer Irv Gotti. The label's roster of artists would include Ja Rule, Ashanti and Lloyd, among others. The first release from Murder Inc. Records under Def Jam was Ja Rule's debut studio album, Venni Vetti Vecci. The album, released June 1, 1999, peaked in the top 3 on the Billboard Top 200 and was certified platinum in America. On October 10, 2000, Def Jam and Murder Inc. released Ja Rule's second studio album, Rule 3:36. Anchored by the success of the lead single Between Me and You, the album debuted at number one on the Billboard top 200 and going on to be certified triple platinum in America.

The following year, it launched another subsidiary, Def Jam South, which focused on Southern rap and distributed releases from labels such as Disturbing tha Peace, whose artist roster included its co-founder Ludacris, Chingy, Shawnna, Bobby Valentino and Playaz Circle. Russell Simmons tapped Houston hip hop legend and former Rap-A-Lot recording artist Scarface as the original head of Def Jam South.

2000s
In 2000, The Island Def Jam Music Group announced the formation of Def Jam Germany, the first international Def Jam company. This increased the label's presence around the world. Def Jam Germany signed German rappers Spezializtz and Philly MC. The label was located in Berlin and opened on May 23, 2000. In addition to signing and marketing local artists, Def Jam Germany also marketed all U.S. signed Def Jam artists in the German territory. But the German division folded just two years later in 2002. Many of the artists were picked up by Universal/Urban, while others did not get a new contract.

The second international label is a Japanese branch, also founded in 2000. The label was later rebranded as Def Jam Recordings; however, it is sometimes still referred to as Def Jam Japan. Their artist roster has included Japanese-American singer Ai, Teriyaki Boyz, AK-69, Nitro Microphone Underground, and South Korean boy band BTS.

In January 2003, Murder Inc. became the center of a money laundering investigation involving illegal profits from drug trading, leading to the label's eventual release from its distribution contract by 2005. Def Jam also blocked Murder Inc. and TVT Records from releasing a Cash Money Click reunion album, due to Ja Rule's contractual obligations, which alleged that Cohen paid Ja and Irv Gotti $8 million not to submit the project to TVT, but instead to parent company Universal. This resulted in TVT suing Def Jam, alleging infringement, fraud and tortious interference, winning $132 million in a judgment, but was later reduced to $126,000 after Universal and Def Jam appealed the ruling, claiming that the existence of an agreement between the parties meant that their behavior was only a breach of contract and not fraud.

The final shares of Roc-A-Fella Records were sold to Island Def Jam in 2004 for $10 million. By that time, Roc-A-Fella and Def Jam had launched the career of rapper-producer Kanye West. His debut, The College Dropout, went on to sell over two million copies. Co-founder Damon Dash and Kareem "Biggs" Burke were forced out of the label as Cohen left IDJMG for Warner Music Group, and was replaced by music executive Antonio "L.A." Reid. Frustrated, Liles and now-chairwoman of Atlantic Records, Julie Greenwald (who had been a part of the Def Jam staff since 1990) eventually decided to follow Cohen to Warner. A bidding war for Jay-Z's contract began, and Reid appointed Jay-Z president of Def Jam on December 8, 2004. Long time label veterans LL Cool J and DMX (the latter of whom had five number one albums under the label within a five-year gap between 1998 and 2003), as well as new signee Joe Budden expressed discomfort with Jay-Z's leadership of the label, having altogether left the label since then.

Under Jay-Z's leadership, Def Jam launched the successful careers of contemporary R&B singers Rihanna and Ne-Yo. At the end of 2007, after he released American Gangster, Jay-Z decided not to renew his contract as the president and CEO of Def Jam in order to start his new Live Nation venture, Roc Nation. Following Jay-Z's departure, L.A. Reid took over leadership of the label, as opposed to hiring a replacement. In June 2008, Shakir Stewart was appointed as the executive vice president of Def Jam, a position that was previously left vacant since December 2007. However, on November 1, Stewart committed suicide, vacating the position again. Stewart was responsible for helping to sign Young Jeezy to the label in 2004.

2010s

In March 2011, it was announced that former Warner Bros. Records executive Joie Manda would become the first president of Def Jam since Jay-Z. Around the summer of 2011, after Universal Music disbanded the Universal Motown Republic Group, Motown Records would be moved under the Island Def Jam umbrella. In 2012, Manda assumed the position of president until March 2013 when he exited his post. It was later announced by his former boss, Barry Weiss, that he would be in charge of the urban division at Def Jam's sister Universal Music label, Interscope Records. The-Dream served as Def Jam's executive vice president of A&R at Def Jam between 2012 and 2014. No I.D. held the position of executive vice president after helping to establish GOOD Music with Kanye West. He later became the executive vice president of the urban division at Def Jam's sister Universal label, Capitol Music Group.

On April 1, 2014, it was announced that the Island Def Jam Music Group would no longer be active following the resignation of CEO Barry Weiss. A press release serviced by Universal Music Group stated that IDJMG, and all of its assets would be reorganized into Def Jam, Island and Motown, all as separate entities.

Def Jam Recordings currently operates as a stand-alone label within the Universal Music Group. Def Jam signed DaniLeigh to the label in early 2017. Steve Bartels served as president and CEO of Def Jam since 2013 until an announcement commenced on August 3, 2017, stating that in January 2018, Eminem's manager and co-founder of Shady Records, Paul Rosenberg would be appointed chairman and CEO of Def Jam.

On September 17, 2019, the launch of Def Jam South East Asia was announced at Music Matters, an annual music industry conference held in Singapore, where Joe Flizzow from Malaysia, Daboyway from Thailand, Yung Raja, Fariz Jabba and Alif from Singapore and A. Nayaka from Indonesia were announced as the label's six inaugural signings. That same month, Def Jam re-signed LL Cool J and DMX after nine and fourteen respective years apart from the label.

In late 2019, the label made its debut in the Philippines through Universal Music Philippines, led by former Sony Music Philippines and Sindikato Management executive Enzo Valdez. Pinoy hip hop quartet VVS Collective was the label's first signed artists.

2020s 
On February 21, 2020, Paul Rosenberg stepped down on his positions as chairman and CEO of Def Jam. He was replaced by the head of business affairs at Universal Music, Jeffrey Harleston, who instead assumed interim control over the label. That November, Def Jam teamed up with Alex and Alec Boateng to create a new UK spin-off label called 0207 Def Jam under Universal Music UK's EMI Records. The UK roster currently consists of Stormzy. Def Jam also expanded to Africa with the creation of Def Jam Africa.

On April 9, 2021, returning label veteran DMX died in a White Plains hospital a week after suffering from drug overdose succumbing him to a fatal heart attack. A month later, Def Jam released his posthumous album, Exodus. Two digital greatest hits albums by DMX were also available for streaming under the label throughout the final quarter of the year: A Dog's Prayer and The Legacy.

Later that year, Harleston conference-called hip-hop legend Snoop Dogg and named him the executive consultant of Def Jam. Snoop agreed to Harleston's request and took over the consultancy role in July. In August 2021, Harleston announced that he will replace himself as the interim president of Def Jam with former Interscope/RCA executive and Keep Cool founder Tunji Balogun, who agreed to take on the role as chairman and CEO, which he did on New Year's Day 2022.

In late-October 2022, Def Jam ended their partnership with GOOD Music, Kanye West's label, in response to the founder's online and public media outbursts, including his 2024 presidential campaign, antisemitic and pro-race remarks. Although, West had already been exiled from the label after releasing Donda on August 29, 2021, as so Pusha T after It's Almost Dry on April 22 earlier that year, making 070 Shake's You Can't Kill Me the final release under the GOOD/Def Jam partnership.

Presidents

Lyor Cohen (1988–1998)
Kevin Liles (1998–2004)
Jay-Z (2005–2007)
L.A. Reid (2008–2012)
Joie Manda (2012–2013)
Steve Bartels (2013–2017)
Paul Rosenberg (2018–2020) 
Jeffrey Harleston (acting, 2020–2022)
Tunji Balogun (2022–present)

Executive Vice Presidents

No I.D. (2012–2014)

Current artists 

 070 Shake
 Adekunle Gold
 Alessia Cara
 Alif
 Amir Obè
 Armani White
 Benny the Butcher
 Beau Young Prince
 Big Sean
 Bru-C
 Coco Jones
 Daboyway
 Dave East 
 DJ Khaled
 Fabolous
 Fredo Bang
 Hit-Boy
 Jadakiss
 Young Jeezy
 Jeremih
 Jhené Aiko
 Justin Bieber
 Kaash Paige
 Krept and Konan
 Lady Sovereign
 LL Cool J 
 Ludacris
 Muni Long
 Nasty C
 Public Enemy
 Snoop Dogg
 Stormzy
 Teyana Taylor
 Toya Johnson
 Trouble
 YG
 YK Osiris

See also
 Krush Groove
 Def Jam Recordings discography

References

External links
 Interview with Shakir Stewart, HitQuarters Nov 5

 
American record labels
Companies based in New York City
Labels distributed by Universal Music Group
Contemporary R&B record labels
American hip hop record labels
Record labels established in 1983
Def Jam Recordings artists
Rick Rubin